Plas John Johnson Jr. (born July 21, 1931) is an American soul-jazz and hard bop tenor saxophonist, probably most widely known as the tenor saxophone soloist on Henry Mancini’s "The Pink Panther Theme". He also performs on alto and baritone sax as well as various flutes and clarinets.

Biography
Born in Donaldsonville, Louisiana, United States, he sang with his family's group until his saxophonist father bought him a soprano saxophone.  Largely self-taught, he soon began playing alto and later tenor saxophone.  He and his pianist brother Ray first recorded as the Johnson Brothers in New Orleans in the late 1940s, and Plas first toured with R&B singer Charles Brown in 1951.  After army service, he and his brother moved to Los Angeles in 1954, and he soon began session recordings as a full-time musician, backing artists such as B.B. King and Johnny Otis as well as scores of other R&B performers.  An early supporter was Maxwell Davis, who hired him to take over his own parts so that he could concentrate on producing sessions for the Modern record label.

Recruited by Johnny Otis and executive Dave Cavanaugh for Capitol Records in the mid-1950s, Johnson also played on innumerable records by Peggy Lee, Nat "King" Cole, Glen Gray, Frank Sinatra and others.  He remained a leading session player for almost twenty years, averaging two sessions a day and playing everything from movie soundtracks and Les Baxter's exotica albums, to rock and roll singles by such artists as Ricky Nelson and Bobby Vee, and R&B records by such performers as Larry Williams, Bobby Day, and Richard Berry.  He played on many of the Beach Boys’ records, and was an integral part of a number of instrumental groups that existed in name only, such as B. Bumble and the Stingers and The Marketts.  Unlike many session musicians of the time he became known by name, but for a time also recorded under the pseudonym Johnny Beecher for the budget CRC Charter label to avoid contractual disputes.

In the late 1950s and early 1960s, he was a regular member of Henry Mancini's studio orchestra and in 1963 he recorded "The Pink Panther Theme", written by Mancini with Johnson in mind.  Johnson said of the recording: "We only did two takes, I think...  When we finished, everyone applauded -- even the string players. And that's saying something... They never applaud for anything."

In 1969, T-Bone Walker introduced Harmonica Slim to the record producer Bob Thiele.  Thiele utilised a company of jazz and R&B musicians including Johnson, to work with Harmonica Slim on his debut album.

Johnson joined the studio band for the Merv Griffin Show in 1970, and also played with a number of jazz and swing bands of the period.  He joined Lincoln Mayorga in creating direct-to-disc recordings for Sheffield Labs.  He later recorded for the Concord label, worked with the Capp-Pierce Juggernaut, and toured in 1990 with the Gene Harris Superband. He continues to record and perform, particularly at jazz festivals.

Discography

As leader/co-leader
 Plas Johnson [also released as Drum Stuff] (Tampa, 1956)
 Rockin' with Plas: The Capitol Singles (Capitol, 1957-59 [1982])
 This Must Be the Plas (Capitol, 1959)
 Mood for the Blues (Capitol, 1961)
 The Blues (Concord Jazz, 1975)
 Positively (Concord Jazz, 1976)
 L.A. '55 with the Grease Patrol (Carell Music, 1983)
 On the Trail! with Totti Bergh (Gemini, 1991 [1993])
 Hot, Blue and Saxy (Carell Music, 1992)
 Evening Delight (Carell Music, 1999)
 Christmas in Hollywood with Ernie Andrews (Carell Music, 2000)
 Keep That Groove Going! with Red Holloway (Milestone, 2001)
 All Blues with Ernie Watts (Mojo [Japan], 2008)

As Johnny Beecher
 Sax 5th Ave. (CRC Charter, 1962)
 On the Scene (CRC Charter, 1962)

As sideman
With Ray Anthony
 Like Wild! (Capitol, 1960)
With Chet Baker
 Blood, Chet and Tears (Verve, 1970)
With Les Baxter
 Jungle Jazz (Capitol, 1958)
With Benny Carter
 Aspects (United Artists, 1959)
With Ry Cooder
 Paradise and Lunch (Reprise, 1974)
With Sam Cooke
 Twistin' the Night Away (RCA, 1962)
 Mr. Soul (RCA, 1963)
 Ain't That Good News (RCA, 1964)
With Rita Coolidge
 Rita Coolidge (A&M, 1971)
With Clifford Coulter
 Do It Now! (Impulse!, 1971)
With Bobby Darin
 Venice Blue (Capitol, 1965)
With Neil Diamond
 The Christmas Album (Columbia, 1992)
With Dr. John
 Gris-Gris (Atco, 1968)
With Ella Fitzgerald
 Ella Fitzgerald Sings the Harold Arlen Songbook (Verve, 1961)
 Ella Fitzgerald Sings the Jerome Kern Song Book (Verve, 1963)
 Ella Fitzgerald Sings the Johnny Mercer Song Book (Verve, 1964)
With Marvin Gaye
 Let's Get It On (Motown, 1973)
With Etta James
 Deep in the Night (Warner Bros., 1978)
With Elton John
 Duets (MCA, 1993)
With B.B. King
 Blues in My Heart (Crown, 1963)
 L.A. Midnight (ABC, 1972)
 Live at the Apollo (MCA, 1991)
With Carole King
 Music (Ode, 1971)
 Speeding Time (Atlantic, 1983)
With Nicolette Larson
 Nicolette (Warner Bros., 1978)
With Peggy Lee
 Blues Cross Country (Capitol, 1962)
With Henry Mancini
 The Music from Peter Gunn (RCA, 1958)
 More Music from Peter Gunn (RCA, 1959)
 Uniquely Mancini (RCA, 1963)
 The Pink Panther (RCA, 1964)
 Mancini '67 (RCA, 1966)
 The Party (RCA, 1968)
With Teena Marie
 Emerald City (Epic, 1986)
With The Marketts
 "Balboa Blue" (Union Records 504, 1962; reissue: Liberty 55443)
With Les McCann
 Les McCann Plays the Hits (Limelight, 1966)
 Bucket o' Grease (Limelight, 1967)
With Bette Midler
 Broken Blossom (Atlantic, 1977)
With Liza Minnelli
 Tropical Nights (Columbia, 1977)
With Joni Mitchell
 Travelogue (Nonesuch, 2002)
With Maria Muldaur
 Waitress in a Donut Shop (Reprise, 1974)
 Sweet Harmony (Reprise, 1976)
With John Neel
 Blue Martini (Ava, 1963)
With Aaron Neville
 Warm Your Heart (A&M, 1991)
 The Grand Tour (A&M, 1993)
 Aaron's Soulful Christmas (A&M, 1993)
With The Platters
 The Great Pretender (Mercury, 1955)
With Minnie Riperton
 Stay in Love (Epic, 1977)
With Johnny Rivers
 New Lovers and Old Friends (Epic, 1975)
With Shorty Rogers
 Gospel Mission (Capitol, 1963)
With Linda Ronstadt
 What's New (Asylum, 1983)
 Lush Life (Asylum, 1984)
 For Sentimental Reasons (Asylum, 1986)
 Winter Light (Elektra, 1993)
 We Ran (Elektra, 1998)
With Pete Rugolo
 10 Saxophones and 2 Basses (Mercury, 1961)
With Boz Scaggs
 Silk Degrees (Columbia, 1976)
With Lalo Schifrin
 More Mission: Impossible (Paramount, 1968)
 Mannix (Paramount, 1968)
With Rhoda Scott
 From C to Shining C (Doodlin' Records, 2009)
With Steely Dan
 The Royal Scam (ABC, 1976)
With Rod Stewart
 A Night on the Town (Warner Bros., 1976)
 Stardust: The Great American Songbook, Volume III (J Records, 2004)
With Eddie "Cleanhead" Vinson
 The Original Cleanhead (BluesTime, 1970)
With Tom Waits
 Heartattack and Vine (Asylum, 1980)
With Deniece Williams
 This Is Niecy (Columbia, 1976)
With the Gerald Wilson Orchestra
 State Street Sweet (MAMA, 1995)

References

External links

African-American saxophonists
American jazz saxophonists
American male saxophonists
Soul-jazz saxophonists
Hard bop saxophonists
Living people
1931 births
People from Donaldsonville, Louisiana
Singers from Louisiana
The Wrecking Crew (music) members
Gemini Records artists
21st-century American saxophonists
Jazz musicians from Louisiana
21st-century American male musicians
American male jazz musicians
The Capp-Pierce Juggernaut members
21st-century African-American musicians
20th-century African-American people
Lyle Lovett and His Large Band members
The T-Bones members